Barbara "Willy" Mendes (born January 30, 1948) is an American cartoonist, fine artist, and influential member of the underground comix movement. She is best known for her work alongside Trina Robbins on It Ain't Me Babe and All Girl Thrills. Although Mendes first created art under the name Willy, she later transitioned to the name Barbara.

Education 
Mendes attended New York City's High School of Music and Art, followed by the University of California, Riverside.

Career
Mendes worked in underground comix while also producing other work for exhibitions in art galleries around the United States. Her art draws inspiration from Judaism and feminist themes.

Early work 
Mendes began her career in underground comix in the late 1960s. She collaborated with Trina Robbins and Nancy Kalish on Gothic Blimp Works, the comix supplement of the East Village Other, an underground newspaper. Mendes and Robbins continued working together, publishing It Ain't Me Babe, an all-women comic book, in 1970. In 1971, Mendes published Illuminations, which portrays more psychedelic work. She then stepped away from the comix scene and transitioned, adopting the name Barbara Mendes. Mendes claims that her "stuff was never raw and sexual ... It was about hippies saving the world through spirituality".

Recent work 
After completing a mural in a Sephardic Synagogue in Los Angeles, Mendes began to study Torah and actively practice Judaism. Mendes later opened her own art gallery in downtown Los Angeles, where she paints brightly colored biblical narratives based on Genesis, Exodus, and Leviticus, the first three books of the Torah. Mendes created her own style of "Epic Paintings", consisting of brightly colored, narrative imagery displaying biblical stories and messages.

In 2017, a scene from Bruno Kohfield-Galeano's short film 'The Blinking Game' was filmed in Mendes' studio and features many of her paintings.

Mendes returned to comics in 2020 with the release of Queen of Cosmos Comix from Red 5 Comics. The book combines her modern biblical narrative paintings with her 1970s’ underground comix work into a modern personal and religious narrative.

Bibliography

Comics 
Source:
 "Make Money, Sell American Seeds," in Slow Death Funnies #1 (Last Gasp, April 1970)
 "Oma," in It Ain't Me, Babe (Last Gasp, July 1970)
 "Ada," in Insect Fear #2 (Print Mint, Mar. 1971)
 "Take This Woman Comix" in San Francisco Comic Book #3 (Print Mint, Aug. 1971)
 Multiple stories in All Girl Thrills #1 (Print Mint, 1971)
 "Easy Come Easy Go," in Yellow Dog #23 (Print Mint, Oct. 1972)
 "The Hippy Wedding," in The Someday Funnies (Abrams, 2011) — reprint of a story from the 1970s
 Queen of Cosmos Comix  (Red 5 Comics, 2020)

Editor 
 It Ain't Me, Babe (Last Gasp, July 1970)
 Illuminations (1971)

References

Living people
1948 births
20th-century American artists
20th-century American writers
21st-century American artists
21st-century American writers
American women illustrators
American illustrators
American female comics artists
Underground cartoonists
20th-century American women artists
21st-century American women artists